Premna hans-joachimii is a species of plant in the family Lamiaceae. It is native to southeastern Tanzania and northeastern Mozambique.

References

hansjoachimii
Flora of Tanzania
Flora of Mozambique
Taxonomy articles created by Polbot
Plants described in 1992